The Lightning Flyer is a 1931 American pre-Code action film directed by William Nigh and starring James Hall, Dorothy Sebastian and Robert Homans.

Plot
After graduating from college, the son of a railroad president takes a job working for the company under an assumed name to prove that he isn't as lazy as his father thinks. He falls in love but also makes a bitter enemy in the yard foreman. After exposing the man as a thief and a murderer, his antagonist breaks out of prison and seeks revenge by way of a runaway train.

Cast
 James Hall as Jimmie Nelson
 Dorothy Sebastian as Rose Rogers
 Walter Merrill as Tom Summers
 Robert Homans as John Nelson
 Albert J. Smith as Durkin
 Ethan Allen as Sam Rogers
 Eddie Boland as Slats
 George Meadows as Pudge

References

Bibliography
 Martin, Len D. Columbia Checklist: The Feature Films, Serials, Cartoons, and Short Subjects of Columbia Pictures Corporation, 1922-1988. McFarland, 1991.

External links
 

1931 films
1930s action films
American action films
Films directed by William Nigh
Columbia Pictures films
1930s English-language films
1930s American films